The Germantown Municipal School District (GMSD) is a municipal school district serving Germantown, Tennessee, United States. The school district was formed in 2013.

The schools included in the district are Dogwood Elementary School, Forest Hill Elementary School, Farmington Elementary School, Houston Middle School, Riverdale K–8, and Houston High School. Germantown Elementary School, Germantown Middle School, and Germantown High School remain in Shelby County Schools.

With an enrollment of over 5,900 students by 2017, the district has seen huge increases in enrollment since opening its doors in 2014.  In the spring of 2016, Germantown Municipal Schools broke ground on an addition to Riverdale K-8 School.  The 64,000 square foot add-on will house the school's middle school population. Due to the enrollment numbers in the elementary school grade bands continues to grow, the school district is decided to build a new elementary school, and the school opened in the spring of 2018. The high school also saw two additions in its first year: a television studio and a new turf field.

The school board hired Jason Manuel as the district's first superintendent. The district was named one of twelve "Exemplary Districts" in Tennessee. In 2015, two of its schools performed in the top 15% for performance on standardized tests, and the district as a whole earned the highest ACT average for the entire State of Tennessee in its first and second years (consecutively). Manuel and his staff deliver frequent presentations across the State as to how the District has pulled off such successes in such a short time. 

Germantown Municipal Schools have also been named a Top Place to Work in both 2015 and 2016 by the Commercial Appeal.

References

External links
 Germantown Municipal School District

School districts in Shelby County, Tennessee
Germantown, Tennessee
School districts established in 2013